This is an alphabetical list of historic houses in the U.S. state of Kentucky.

List of historic houses in Kentucky
Listing includes date of the start of construction:

Abner Gaines House (Walton) – Federal-style house; built 1814
Allenhurst (Scott County) – Greek Revival style mansion designed by Thomas Lewinski; built 1850
Audubon (Scott County) – Greek Revival style house; built 1829
Ashland (Lexington) – Estate of American statesmen Henry Clay; built c. 1806
Beeches (Frankfort) – Federal-style house; built 1800
Ben Johnson House (Bardstown) – Home of Lieutenant Governor William Johnson and his son Ben Johnson; built 1851
Berry Mansion (Frankfort) – Colonial Revival style house; built 1900
Boxhill (Glenview) – Georgian Revival style mansion; built c. 1906
Branham House (Georgetown) – Part of South Broadway Neighborhood District; built 1795
Bullock-Clifton House (Louisville) – Federal-style farmhouse. Oldest surviving wood-frame structure in Jefferson County; built 1834
Carneal House (Covington) – Oldest house in the city. Constructed by Thomas D. Carneal, one of Covington's founders; built 1815
Catlett House/Beechmoor (Catlettsburg) – Home of Alexander and Horatio Catlett, founders of Catlettsburg; built 1812
Colson House (Middlesboro) – Oldest remaining house in Bell County; built 1800
Conrad-Caldwell House (Louisville) – Richardsonian-style mansion located within the St. James-Belgravia Historic District; built 1893
Croghan Mansion (Louisville) – Home of George Rogers Clark and his sister, Lucy Clark Croghan. Remains the only residence still in existence west of the Appalachian Mountains to have sheltered Louis and Clark; built c. 1790
D. W. Griffith House (La Grange) – Home of movie director D. W. Griffith; built 1905
Daniel Carter Beard Boyhood Home (Covington) – Home of Daniel Carter Beard, a founder of Boy Scouts of America; built 1821
Dinsmore Homestead (Boone County) – Greek Revival and Federal-style home; built 1841
Elijah Herndon House (California) – Federal-style home; built 1818
Elkwood (Georgetown) – built 1810
Farmington (Louisville) – Home of James Speed, 27th U.S. Attorney General. Based on plans by Thomas Jefferson; built 1815
Federal Hill (Bardstown) – Home of senator John Rowan. Served as Stephen Foster's inspiration for the song My Old Kentucky Home; built 1795
Fielding Bradford House (Scott County)
Foster Sanford House, aka Lady Burlington  (Burlington, Kentucky) – Grand Federal Style with Greek Revival c. 1831
Francis M. Stafford House (Paintsville) – Home of John Stafford, a founder of Paintsville. Oldest surviving house in Johnson County; built 1843
Fryer House (Butler) – Home of pioneer Walter Fryer; built 1811
Glen Willis (Frankfort) – built 1815
Hausgen House (Anchorage) – Colonial Revival style house; built c. 1890
Hawkins House (Georgetown) – Has served as a ropewalk and a dormitory for the Georgetown Female Seminary. Became a residential home in 1858; built c. 1790
Hikes-Hunsinger House (Louisville) – Federal-style residence; built 1824
Hunt-Morgan House (Lexington) – Home of John Wesley Hunt, the first millionaire west of the Allegheny Mountains and John Hunt Morgan.  Birthplace of Thomas Hunt Morgan, the only Kentuckian to be awarded a Nobel Prize; built 1814
Hurricane Hall (Fayette County) – built 1794
Jacob Eversole Cabin (Perry County) – built ca 1789–1804, the oldest remaining building in Eastern Kentucky
James M. Lloyd House (Mount Washington) – Italianate and Late Victorian style residence; built c. 1880
Jesse R. Zeigler House (Frankfort) – Only building designed by Frank Lloyd Wright in Kentucky; built 1910
John Andrew Miller House (Scott County) – Home of pioneer John Andrew Miller. Served as a community shelter from Native American attacks; built 1785
Johnston-Jacobs House (Georgetown) – Greek Revival style brick home; built 1795
John Tanner House (Petersburg) – Oldest surviving home in Boone County; built 1810
Julius Blackburn House (Scott County) – Home to American Revolutionary War veteran Julius Blackburn; built 1799
Kentucky Governor's Mansion (Frankfort) – Beaux-Arts style residence for the Governor of Kentucky; built 1912
Landward House (Louisville) – Brick Italianate mansion; built 1871
Liberty Hall (Frankfort) – Home to many notable Americans including John Brown and Margaret Wise Brown; built 1796
Lincliff (Glenview) – Georgian Revival mansion; built 1911
Lloyd Tilghman House (Paducah) – Home of Lloyd Tilghman; built 1852
Longview Farm House (Adairville) – A Italianate and Greek Revival style home; built 1851
Martin Castle (Fayette County) – European-inspired castle built by Rex and Caroline Martin. Currently serves as a hotel; built 1969
Mary Todd Lincoln House (Lexington) – Home of former first lady, Mary Todd Lincoln; built c. 1803
Mayo Mansion (Ashland) – A Beaux-Arts architecture mansion built in 1917 by Alice Jane Mayo
Mayo Mansion (Paintsville) – Home of John C. C. Mayo; built 1905
McClure-Shelby House (Jessamine County) – Greek Revival and Federal style residence; built 1840
McConnell House (Greenup County) – Federal, Georgian and Greek Revival style residence; built in 1834
Milliken Memorial Community House (Elkton) – First privately donated community house in the United States; built 1928
Millspring (Georgetown) – Home of Elijah Craig, founder of Georgetown; built 1789
Old Governor's Mansion (Frankfort) – Currently serves as the official residence of the Lieutenant Governor of Kentucky. Serves as the oldest executive residence still in use in the United States; built 1796
Orlando Brown House (Frankfort) – Greek Revival style home designed by Gideon Shryock, designer of the Kentucky State Capitol; built 1835
Payne-Desha House (Georgetown) – Home of Robert Payne, a war hero from the Battle of the Thames; built 1814
Peterson-Dumesnil House (Louisville) – Victorian-Italianate mansion; built c. 1869
Pope Villa (Lexington) – Home of former John Pope, designed by Benjamin Henry Latrobe, architect of the U.S. Capitol Building; built 1811
Farnsley-Moremen House (Louisville) – Brick I-house with a two-story Greek Revival portico; built 1837
Riverview at Hobson Grove (Bowling Green) – Italianate-style mansion; built c. 1850s
Rob Morris Home (La Grange) – Home of Rob Morris, the second and last poet laureate of Freemasonry and the founder of the Order of the Eastern Star.
Ronald-Brennan House (Louisville) – Italianate-style townhouse; built 1868
Rose Hill (Louisville) – Antebellum-style residence; built 1852
Samuel May House (Prestonsburg) – Home of former state senator and representative, Samuel May, built 1816
Shropshire House (Georgetown) – Home of Confederate governor of Kentucky, George W. Johnson; built 1814
Thomas Edison House (Louisville) – Home of Thomas Edison from 1866 to 1867; built c. 1850s
Thomas Huey Farm (Big Bone) – Gothic Revival style home; built 1865
Ward Hall (Georgetown) – Home of Junius and Matilda Viley Ward, built circa 1857
Waveland (Danville) – Home of Willis Green, built 1797
White Hall (Richmond) – Home of Cassius Marcellus Clay, cousin of Henry Clay; built 1799
Wickland (Bardstown) – Home of two governors of Kentucky and one Governor of Louisiana; built 1813
Wickland (Shelbyville) – Classical Revival mansion; built 1901
Whitney Young Birthplace and Museum (Shelby County) – Birthplace of Whitney Young, an American civil rights leader; built 1921
William Forst House (Russellville) – Site at which the Confederate government of Kentucky was formed; built 1820
William Hickman House (Winchester, Kentucky) – Federal-style home; built 1814
Wooldridge-Rose House (Pewee Valley) – Colonial Revival style residence; built 1905
Zachary Taylor House (Louisville) – Boyhood home of 12th President, Zachary Taylor; built 1790

See also

 List of National Historic Landmarks in Kentucky
 List of Registered Historic Places in Kentucky
 Oldest buildings in the United States

References

External links
The Castle Post
Liberty Hall National Historic Site
Ashland: The Henry Clay Estate
Historic Locust Grove
Riverside, Farnsley-Moremen Landing

Historic houses in Kentucky
 List of historic houses in Kentucky